John Boys (c. 1607 – 21 October 1678) was an English politician who sat in the House of Commons  at various times between 1645 and 1656.

Boys was born at Betteshanger, Kent. the son of Edward Boys. He was educated at Canterbury and Winchester. He was admitted to Sidney Sussex College, Cambridge on 22 July 1623 aged 16, and was admitted at Gray's Inn on 1 November 1626.

In 1645, Boys was elected Member of Parliament for Kent in the Long Parliament. He was elected MP for Kent again in 1654 for the First Protectorate Parliament and 1656 for the Second Protectorate Parliament. 
 
Boys died in 1678 and had a monument at Betteshanger.

References

1600s births
1678 deaths
Alumni of Sidney Sussex College, Cambridge
Members of Gray's Inn
Year of birth uncertain
People from Betteshanger
English MPs 1640–1648
English MPs 1654–1655